Starship Troopers is a 1997 American science fiction action film directed by Paul Verhoeven. The film is based on the 1959 novel of the same name by Robert A. Heinlein and was written by Ed Neumeier. Set in the 23rd century, the film follows the story of teenager Johnny Rico and his friends as they serve in the military under the Earth world government, known as the United Citizen Federation. As humanity explores and colonizes outer space, they come into conflict with an alien species known as the Arachnids, leading to an interstellar war. The film stars Casper Van Dien, Dina Meyer, Denise Richards, Jake Busey, Neil Patrick Harris, Patrick Muldoon, and Michael Ironside.

Development of Starship Troopers began in 1991 as a separate project called Bug Hunt at Outpost 7, written by Neumeier. Producer Jon Davison noticed many similarities between Neumeier's work and Heinlein's book and asked him to re-work the script to more closely follow the novel and gain more interest from studio executives. Even so, development was slow, with studios remaining non-committal on funding the expensive project up to the filming date. Filming began in April 1996 on a $100–110million budget, nearly half of which was committed to the extensive computer-generated (CGI) and practical effects required to vivify the Arachnid creatures, before concluding that October.

Starship Troopers was released on November 7, 1997, to negative reviews from critics who perceived the film as promoting fascism, including accusations against Verhoeven and Neumeier of being Nazis, and also criticized its violence and the performances of its central cast. The reviews and poor word-of-mouth led to box office grosses dropping week after week until it left theaters, earning $121million and becoming only the 34th highest-grossing film of the year. The poor performance of Starship Troopers was blamed, in part, on competition from a high number of successful or anticipated science fiction and genre films released that year, and its satirical and violent content failing to connect with mainstream audiences. Verhoeven believed audience misconceptions about the film were the result of poor marketing that presented Starship Troopers as an action film instead of a satire.

Since its release, Starship Troopers has been critically re-evaluated, and is now considered a cult classic, a prescient satire of fascism and authoritarian governance that has grown in relevancy. The film helped launch a multimedia franchise that includes four sequels, Starship Troopers 2: Hero of the Federation (2004), Starship Troopers 3: Marauder (2008), Starship Troopers: Invasion (2012), and Starship Troopers: Traitor of Mars (2017), as well as an animated television series, Roughnecks: Starship Troopers Chronicles (1999), video games, comics, and a variety of merchandise.

Plot 

In the 23rd century, Earth is governed by the United Citizen Federation, a military government founded generations earlier by "veterans" after democracy and social scientists brought civilization to the brink of ruin. Citizenship is gained only through federal service, which grants rights restricted from ordinary civilians such as voting and breeding. Now spacefaring, humans conduct colonization missions throughout the galaxy, bringing them into conflict with a race of highly evolved insectoid creatures dubbed "Arachnids" or, derisively, "bugs".

Despite the protestations of his parents about the risks, teenage jock Johnny Rico enlists as a mobile infantryman to remain close to his girlfriend, spaceship pilot Carmen Ibanez. Their psychic friend Carl Jenkins joins Military Intelligence, while Isabelle "Dizzy" Flores, who is in love with Rico, deliberately transfers to his squad. Carmen eventually breaks up with Rico because their career paths separate them and she has developed a mutual attraction with fellow pilot Zander Barcalow. During training, Rico impresses drill sergeant Zim, earning a promotion to squad leader. He makes a mistake during a training exercise causing the death of one of his squad and the resignation of another, resulting in his demotion and flogging. Rico resigns from the military, but reconsiders after learning that an asteroid sent by the Arachnids has destroyed Buenos Aires, killing millions, including his parents.

An invasion force is deployed to Klendathu, the Arachnids' home planet, but the military intelligence underestimates the Arachnids' defensive abilities, leading to thousands of casualties. Badly wounded, Rico is rescued by lieutenant Jean Rasczak, his former high-school teacher, but is mistakenly reported dead, devastating Carmen. Following his recovery, Rico, Dizzy, and squadmate Ace Levy join Rasczak's special forces unit, the "Roughnecks". Rico eventually earns the rank of Corporal for his feats against the Arachnids, including killing a gigantic "Tanker Bug" on Tango Urilla, and becomes romantically involved with Dizzy. The Roughnecks respond to a distress call on Planet P, where they reconnoitre an Arachnid-ravaged outpost but are quickly overwhelmed by the bugs. Carmen and Zander recover the surviving Roughnecks by dropship, but not before Dizzy is killed and Rico is forced to mercy kill the mutilated Rasczak. The group returns to the fleet assembled in orbit above P, where Dizzy is eulogized.

Jenkins, now a high-ranking colonel, explains the Roughnecks were deliberately sent into the trap, justifying it as a necessary sacrifice to prove the existence of a "Brain Bug"; an intelligent Arachnid strategically directing the others. He grants Rico command of the Roughnecks and field-promotes him to lieutenant, ordering him back to P to capture the Brain Bug. As the battle commences, Carmen's ship is destroyed by the Arachnids, forcing her and Zander to flee in an escape shuttle that crash lands into an underground tunnel system. The pair are captured by the Arachnids and the Brain Bug uses its proboscis to consume Zander's brain, absorbing his knowledge. Rico sends his squad to complete their mission while he, Ace, and their squadmate Watkins find Carmen and hold the Arachnids at bay with a miniature nuclear bomb.

The Brain Bug escapes while the Arachnids attack and mortally wound Watkins, who sacrifices himself by detonating the bomb while his teammates escape. On the surface, they learn that Zim has captured the Brain Bug, and the assembled troops rejoice as Jenkins psychically detects it is afraid. A propaganda advertisement details how the Brain Bug is being invasively studied to learn its secrets and ensure humanity's victory. The advert encourages the viewers to enlist and do their part in the war so they can become like Carmen, now captain of her own ship, and Rico, who enthusiastically leads his troops into another battle.

Cast 

 Casper Van Dien as Johnny Rico: A school sports star turned military infantryman
 Dina Meyer as Dizzy Flores: Rico's former classmate who joins the mobile infantry
 Denise Richards as Carmen Ibanez: An aspiring starship pilot and Rico's girlfriend
 Jake Busey as Ace Levy: A military infantryman
 Neil Patrick Harris as Carl Jenkins: A psychic who joins military intelligence.
 Clancy Brown as Sgt. Zim: Rico's sergeant during training
 Seth Gilliam as Sugar Watkins: A member of the Roughnecks special forces unit
 Patrick Muldoon as Zander Barcalow: Rico's rival who is romantically interested in Carmen
 Michael Ironside as Jean Rasczak: A former teacher turned squad leader

Starship Troopers also features Rue McClanahan as a biology teacher, Marshall Bell as General Owen, Eric Bruskotter as Breckinridge, Matt Levin as Kitten Smith, Anthony Ruivivar as Shujumi, Brenda Strong as Captain Deladier, and Dean Norris as Commanding Officer. Christopher Curry and Lenore Kasdorf appear as Mr. and Mrs. Rico, while Bruce Gray and Denise Dowse appear as Sky Marshals Dienes and Meru. Other military infantry characters include Katrina (Blake Lindsley) and Djana'd (Tami-Adrian George). Corporals Bronski and Birdie are portrayed by Teo and Ungela Brockman, Sergeant Gillespie by Curnal Alesio, and Robert David Hall portrays a heavily disfigured Recruitment Sergreant.

Key crew members make cameo appearances, including producer Jon Davison as the Angry Survivor of the Buenos Aires' asteroid attack who says "the only good bug is a dead bug," and Neumeier appears as a handcuffed prisoner standing before Federation judges. Verhoeven's assistant, Stacy Lumbrezer, is a smiling woman during a psychic advertisement, and Paul Sammon, author of The Making of Starship Troopers, appears as one of the men feeding a cow to an Arachnid.

Production

Development as Bug Hunt at Outpost 7
Since the release of RoboCop (1987), producer Jon Davison had wanted to develop another project that would reunite members of the creative team such as writer Ed Neumeier and stop motion animator Phil Tippett, but struggled to progress any relevant projects. Neumeier had separately been struggling to develop new story ideas alongside his RoboCop co-writer Michael Miner. The pair eventually realized their writing partnership was no longer working and Neumeier began developing a story treatment called Bug Hunt at Outpost 7. He said, "I wanted to do a big, silly, jingoistic, xenophobic, let's-go-out-and-kill-the-enemy movie, and I had settled on the idea that it should be against insects... I wanted to make a war movie, but I also wanted to make a teenage romance movie." Insects were chosen as the enemies based on Neumeier's wife's strong fear of the creatures.

In December 1991, Neumeier brought his idea to Davison at Warner Bros. Studios, Burbank, which also headquartered TriStar Pictures, with whom Davison had a pre-existing development deal. After discussing the idea, Davison realized it bore many similarities to the 1959 science fiction novel, Starship Troopers, by Robert A. Heinlein. The novel had received a strongly divided reception on its release for promoting military power and necessary violence while criticizing liberal social programs, but it had remained an enduringly popular work for over four decades.

Neumeier and Davison had both read the novel as children and considered directly adapting Starship Troopers instead of Neumeier's story. However, Davison believed the film adaptation rights would have already been purchased by that point and encouraged Neumeier to continue his original idea, later retitled Outpost 7. By late 1992, Davison was working out of Sony Pictures Studios, Culver City, when Neumeier brought him the finished Outpost 7, alternately referred to as Bug Hunt. Although Davison liked the treatment, it was rejected by TriStar executive Chris Lee. Undeterred, Neumeier and Davison decided to research the film rights to Starship Troopers, believing the more well-known intellectual property would change Lee's mind. They learned the rights were available and instead pitched making Starship Troopers. Lee was more receptive, but the pair also received broader support from other executives including TriStar head of production, Mike Medavoy, who had been similarly supportive of making RoboCop. With the studio's support in place, the rights to Starship Troopers were purchased and Neumeier began adapting his Outpost 7 script to more closely fit Heinlein's novel.

Development as Starship Troopers

Progress of the Starship Troopers adaptation remained slow for the next few years as TriStar regularly replaced executives, including Medavoy, and high-value or risky projects were more closely scrutinized. Even so, Davison spent much of 1993 securing several key crew including Tippett and their other RoboCop collaborator, Paul Verhoeven. According to Neumeier and Davison, they had only ever considered Verhoeven as the director because they determined the fantastical creatures, genre, and political subtext suited his creative sensibilities. Verhoeven said, "I like science fiction movies. I mean, the Star Wars series is delightful, you know? ...but the main reason I decided to do Starship Troopers was Phil Tippett. I had worked with Phil on RoboCop and felt that was really interesting..." Verhoeven considered himself the director of the live characters, and described Tippett as effectively his co-director, leading filming of the creatures. Verhoeven also brought in Alan Marshall as a producer, having worked with him on Basic Instinct (1992) and his current project, Showgirls (1995). Verhoeven was in need of a promising project as, despite his previous successes in the early 1990s, his efforts to develop the pirate adventure Mistress of the Seas and the Arnold Schwarzenegger-starring Crusade had failed. Additionally, Showgirls had become a financial failure and earned him the worst reviews of his career.

By 1994, the studio had still not agreed to move Starship Troopers out of the development phase and into pre-production. Key crew members, including Davison and Verhoeven, decided to produce test footage to demonstrate their intended visual style and tone. Although still busy filming Showgirls at this point, Verhoeven was determined to direct the sequence himself. The scene was storyboarded and detailed enough that Tippett's design for the "Warrior Bugs" changed little by the time of actual filming. The resulting 40-second to 2-minute scene, dubbed the "Bug Test", was filmed on July 21, 1994, at Vasquez Rocks near Los Angeles at a cost of $225,000 provided by TriStar. Filmed by John Hora with a 30-person crew, the sequence depicts a soldier (played by Mitch Gaylord) being pursued and killed by two Warrior Bugs; Neumeier makes a cameo appearance as a dead soldier. The visual effects were finished by September, and the completed "Bug Test" screened for TriStar executives in early October.

Executives including Lee and Mark Canton were impressed with the visual effects and did not realize they had been produced with computer-generated imagery (CGI) and approved moving into pre-production, but others remained non-committal on providing any substantial funding as, according to Neumeier, they did not understand the project. Development continued at a slow pace into early 1995 when Davison put together a detailed budget totalling $90million, based on Neumeier's third draft. Davison said TriStar was reluctant to provide this amount, often bringing up the financial failure of the $200million-budgeted Waterworld (1995), which was seen by industry experts as an example of excessive spending and had led to the firing of many involved executives at Universal Pictures. TriStar executives determined that the only way for Starship Troopers to continue development was to identify a business partner with whom they could split the production costs. Davison said he began screening the Bug Test for anyone he could, eventually attracting the interest of Walt Disney Studios. A meeting was held with, among others, Canton and Marc Platt from TriStar, Sony, Disney's head of motion pictures, Joe Roth, Verhoeven, Davison, and Marshall. An agreement was made that the studios would produce Starship Troopers via TriStar and Disney's Touchstone Pictures, splitting the budget costs and box office profits evenly, in exchange for Touchstone receiving all distribution rights to the film outside of the United States and Canada. Each studio was also given creative input on the film and its marketing.

Writing

Neumeier began adapting the Starship Troopers novel at the beginning of 1993, working out of his office in Eagle Rock, Los Angeles. He was initially concerned about how to translate the tone of Heinlein's work, recalling his awareness as a youth of the controversy surrounding the novel that identified Heinlein as alternately a conservative, militarist, libertarian, and fascist. The novel espouses the benefits of military service, citizenship, and masculinity. Heinlein described the central theme  as being "that a man, to be truly human, must be unhesitatingly willing at all times to lay down his life for his fellow man. [This theme] is based on the twin concepts of love and duty-and how they are related to the survival of our race." Neumeier was interested in writing about fascism, but was concerned it would be difficult to do so successfully. Despite this, he and Davison wanted to accurately adapt the novel's and Heinlein's viewpoint. Neumeier believed audiences would appreciate the concept of a failing democracy and stricter cultural controls. He said: "you want a world that works? Okay, we'll show you one. And it really does work. It happens to be a military dictatorship, but it works. That was the original rhythm I was trying to play with, just to sort of mess with the audiences."

Neumeier struggled to adapt certain aspects, finding the first and third acts to be narratively strong but the middle act, focusing on Rico's boot camp experience, to be a lengthy piece "preaching to his readership," which would not make for an interesting film. He identified the elements he considered essential, including the high school opening, boot camp, battles and the underlying philosophy and sociopolitics, and compensated for the novel's second act by expanding on sequences such as the high school romance, basing it on his own experiences of chasing women with no interest in him. The first draft was completed on July 8, 1993. It remained generally faithful to Heinlein's novel, including a secondary alien race known as the "Skinnies," the "Bounce"—a jet-assisted traversal method, and power armor, which granted the troops superhuman strength. Rasczak's lecture on citizenship was also paraphrased from the novel. A copy was sent to Heinlein's wife who was pleased despite the minor differences to the novel.

However, as development progressed, many aspects would be changed or removed, in part because of financial reasons, but also Verhoeven's influence. Verhoeven tried to read the novel but "stopped after two chapters because it was so boring... it is really quite a bad book... it's a very right-wing book." He had Neumeier summarize the narrative for him, and found it militaristic, fascistic, and overly supportive of armed conflict, which clashed with Verhoeven's childhood experiences in the German-occupied Netherlands during World War II. Verhoeven determined that he could use the basic plot to satirize and undermine the book's themes by deconstructing the concepts of totalitarianism, fascism, and militarism, saying: "All the way through I wanted the audience to be asking, 'Are these people crazy?'"

By 1994, Verhoeven was still filming Showgirls, but remained active in the second draft. Among his suggestions was to introduce a romantic subplot between Rico and Carmen, and combined the male character Dizzy with a Neumeier-created female called Ronnie who was romantically interested in Rico. This in turn led Neumeier to develop romantic triangles between Dizzy, Rico, and Carmen, and Rico, Carmen, and Zander. Other aspects were removed such as the Skinnies, because Verhoeven thought too many alien races would be confusing, while queen bugs and advanced canines called Neo-dogs were considered financially unviable. Another financially motivated change was the removal of "the Drop", a method of dropping troops from orbit in capsules that shed consecutive layers during landing, leading to the nickname "Cap Troopers". Preliminary designs were made of the capsules, but were generally attached to parachutes which did not match the intended aesthetic. Adding rockets was deemed impractical because it would have required numerous different visual effects and taken too much time to accomplish, so they settled for dropships. The most substantial change was making the enemy more insect-like, as Verhoeven did not want to "see a bug with a gun in his hand.”

The Bounce was also removed due to cost and because Marshall said they made the troops look like they were on pogo sticks and removed the threat of the Arachnids if troops could easily jump away. The most controversial omission from the novel, for fans, was the power armor. Davison said that despite the importance of the armor, it was financially impossible to create hundreds of suits for the cast and extras. He and Verhoeven initially agreed to use the power armor sparingly, and integrate various different ideas such as the Bounce and weapons into them, but later determined it gave the troops too much of an advantage against the Arachnids. Additionally, as development continued, any further increase in costs risked the production being cancelled entirely. The FedNet sequences, the main source of information in the future, was invented for the film. An intentional prediction of how Neumeier believed television and computers would eventually be combined, the sequences were depicted in a way that would excite a population with very patriotic narration. Verhoeven described the final script as being about contemporary American politics, such as a lack of gun control and increasing capital punishment under Texas governor George W. Bush, which he believed could potentially lead to fascism. The characters of Starship Troopers were "fascists who don't know they're fascists." He said: "If I tell the world that a right-wing, fascist way of doing things doesn't work, no one will listen to me. So I'm going to make a perfect fascist world: everyone is beautiful, everything is shiny, everything has big guns and fancy ships but it's only good for killing fucking Bugs!" Neumeier completed his third and final draft by early 1995.

Pre-production
Under the company name Big Bug Pictures, the Starship Troopers team were provided with a large suite in the Astaire Building on the Sony lot, from which to work. While pre-production began in earnest by September 1995, after Verhoeven concluded work on Showgirls, he had spent several months producing over 4,000 storyboard images of the Starship Troopers script. Conscious that the Arachnids, among other CGI elements, would be added after filming, he wanted a detailed image of how each scene would be set out during filming. Storyboard artists Robin Richesson and Giacomo Ghiazzi refined Verhoeven's storyboards, the bulk of the comic-book–style art being done by Ghiazzi.

Many key crew members were hired during 1996, including Verhoeven's long-time cinematographer, Jost Vacano, as well as Vic Armstrong (second unit director and stunt coordinator), Mark Goldblatt (editor), John Richardson (special effects supervisor), Basil Poledouris (music composer), Stacey McIntosh (construction coordinator), Karen Higgins (construction foreman), Gregg Goldstone (first assistanct director), Kenneth Silverstein (second assistant director), John Blake (makeup artist), Kathy Blondell (hair stylist), William Petrotta (prop master), Robert "Rock" Galotti (weapons coordinator), production manager Robert Latham Brown, production coordinator Daren Hicks, and assistant production coordinators Janet Campolito and Lisa Hackler. Tippett also began hiring the nearly 100 additional staff required to realize the Arachnids, including Jules Roman (Tippett Studio visual effects producer), Craig Hayes (visual effects artist), Trey Stokes (Animation department head), Adam Valdez and Blake Clark (animators), Paula Luchessi (lead cg painter), 
Julie Newdoll (supervisor of CG lighting), Brennan Doyle (lead compositor), Desiree Mourad (lighting), and Joanna Ladolcetta (lead rotoscoper). Davison's responsibilities focused mainly on the special effects, while Marshall was concerned more with the filming.

Production designer Allan Cameron and location manager Bill Bowling scouted several locations but rejected most as they did not consider them unique enough. Others, such as the Valley of Fire State Park in Nevada had too many environmental restrictions which could impact filming. The situation was made more difficult by an extended period of U.S. government shutdowns, which made obtaining the necessary filming and associated permits protracted, so they intentionally avoided further scouting of national or state parks or government-owned land. This restriction limited their options particularly for impactful scenery. It offered other logistical challenges as it was generally undeveloped land, so the production had to build roads for the trucks carrying their gear into the canyons for filming. Anything that could not be driven in had to be lowered by helicopter. Construction of some on-location sets such as Whiskey Outpost camp began in February 1996 and took six weeks. The local government was supportive of the project, subsidizing the building of the roads and camp. The crew later learned that the area was rife with rattlesnakes, although no crew was bitten.

Another, more easily accessible location, Barry Barber Ranch near Kadoka, South Dakota and the Badlands National Park, featured little vegetations and smooth, undulating landscape, which could serve as Tango Urilla. Even as pre-production continued, Davison remained concerned about the studio's ongoing executive turnover and its inconsistent commitment to funding, saying: "I felt the plug could always be pulled on us any minute." In contrast, Verhoeven believed the repeated regime changes at the studio meant the project was being overlooked until it was too late to cancel it.

Casting

In casting Starship Troopers, Verhoeven wanted cast who visually embodied the caucasian, blonde, blue-eyed, and beautiful image he had perceived in Triumph of the Will (1935) and Olympia (1938), the Nazi propaganda films by Leni Riefenstahl. He described it as "an idiotic story, young people go to fight bugs, so I felt the human characters should have a comic-book look." The search initially focused on popular, well-known film actors aged between their late teens and early twenties, but he realized that many of the contemporary stars were already in their thirties or already committed to other projects. Although television actors were still generally ignored when casting films, the production looked at shows such as Melrose Place and Beverly Hills, 90210, which featured young, photogenic, but less well known actors, such as Van Dien, Richards, and Meyer. Verhoeven later said Starship Troopers could have benefitted from casting actors for their ability instead of looks.

Van Dien went through five auditions for the Rico role. He shared a similar history to the character, his father and grandfather having been in the military and attending military school himself, as well as being the captain of his high school football team. Van Dien was also a science fiction fan, particularly of Star Wars and Star Trek. Mark Wahlberg and Matt Damon also auditioned, but Verhoeven believed Van Dien closely fit the aesthetic of Riefenstahl's films. Richards also went through five auditions to portray Carmen in November and December 1995, before finally screen testing against Van Dien. Unlike her character, Richards said she was terrified of flying. She did not think about the politics of Starship Troopers, saying she was focused on avoiding being fired from her first major film role. Although her agent initially recommended auditioning for Carmen, Meyer was more interested in Dizzy. She thought she could convey the character's "heart" and vulnerability at being overlooked by Rico because her toughness makes her seem like just another guy.

Harris was mainly known at the time for portraying a child doctor on Doogie Howser, M.D. (1989–1993), and wanted a project that would shed that image as he moved into his adult career. Describing playing Jenkins, Harris said: "He's bipolar, in a sense. Almost two completely separate characters. When you first meet [Jenkins]... he's Johnny's best friend. A bit geeky, but also funny, with lots of energy and quips... when you finally see him again... he's worn and pale and has the whole weight of the world on his shoulders. He's also dressed like a German Gestapo officer!" Starship Troopers was the feature film debut for Patrick Muldoon, who was mostly known for Melrose Place. Muldoon said Verhoeven and Neumeier saw Zander as having a dark side, but he considered him to be an "ambiguous character... he's very competitive, and he gets what he wants. But what we finally ended up with, I think, is actually a slightly tougher version of the relationship between Han Solo and Princess Leia in the Star Wars movies." Busey considered Ace Levy to be an integral part of the cast, who finds the humor in the most macabre situations, releasing the tension for the audience. Seth Gilliam described his character "like the [Vietnam war veteran] who kept reenlisting after every tour of duty was over. To my mind, Sugar couldn't deal with being 'back in the world,' as they used to call it."

Clancy Brown portrays Sgt. Zim, a "crusty, macho, jingoistic, ultimately admirable drill instructor." Brown based his performance on archetypical "tough as nails" instructors from older American films such as The D.I. (1957) and Full Metal Jacket (1987), as well as taking guidance from retired Marine captain Dale Dye, who said that he should act as if his soldiers are watching every move he makes. Verhoeven was a fan of Ironside, having attempted to cast him in RoboCop and giving him a central role in Total Recall (1990). His Jean Rasczak character appears early in Starship Troopers to set the tone, and was an original character combining two characters from the novel: Rico's teacher, Lieutenant Colonel Jean V. Dubois, and Lieutenant Rasczak, a heroic soldier. Ironside said that after the character's family is killed in the destruction of Buenos Aires, "there isn't a God in Rasczak's life anymore. That makes him a little suicidal."

About six main actors, including Van Dien, Meyer, Busey, Gilliam and Curnal Aulisio, as well as twenty-four extras undertook a 12-day boot camp training session under Dale Dye from April 17, 1996, to the first day of filming. Taking place in Hell's Half Acre, the boot camp taught basic combat skills and tactics as Dye perceived they may evolve centuries in the future. Those involved slept in open-air military tents, dealing with the harsh conditions including  of snow and ice following a blizzard, and windstorms, and some people did drop out. Extra Julia Rupkalvis later helped Dye train the hundreds of extras portraying troopers. As Richards was not in the Infantry cast she did not have to participate, but she chose to anyway, remarking how she, Van Dien and Busey bonded while huddling together for warmth during the blizzard.

Filming

Principal photography began on April 29, 1996, with six weeks of filming in Hell's Half Acre. The location featured extreme weather, with very warm days and frigid evenings that took a toll on much of the on-site equipment, requiring various replacements to be flown in on a regular basis. The site had to be evacuated temporarily after rain mixing with the bentonite in the ground created a slick surface. The crew took as much equipment as they could, and after the rain stopped two weeks later, miles of electrical cables, some equipment, and even cars had been lost under the mud. Even so, only a few days were lost to the weather as a local warehouse had been converted into a soundstage for backup scenes to be filmed. Alongside the weather conditions, filming in Hell's Half Acre took its toll on the crew, resulting in respiratory illnesses and exhaustion. Dozens of people per day were treated for heat stroke from wearing heavy costumes in the  heat, and production had to be shut down for a week at a cost of $1.5million a day after it affected Busey. The location was used for the Klendathu night battle, which featured about 1,300 background trooper extras on each night of filming. Scenes were filmed mainly with a steadicam while handheld footage was occasionally used for battle scenes, inspired by the Normandy landings in 1944, to make the audience feel a part of the scene. It was designed to be disorienting and gory to set expectations of the film's future combat scenes.

The cast faced a lot of difficulties in interacting with creatures that were not present in the scene and had to learn how to act against invisible objects. Various methods were used to help, including cardboard cutouts and tennis balls or flags on sticks to indicate their positions, as well as Verhoeven wielding a broom. A fatal accident occurred during the Memorial Day holiday weekend in May when some crew, returning to Casper from their vacation at Yellowstone park, were involved in a car crash caused by an oncoming driver, killing the opposing driver and two crew members, and severely injuring Rachel Campos, a crew member's girlfriend. Counselling was offered for the remaining cast and crew, who provided donations towards Campos' recovery, as did the studio. Filming moved to Barry Barber Ranch on June 14, for scenes set on Klendathu and Tango Urilla, before returning to Casper on June 26. The post Tango Urilla battle celebration was filmed separately at Vasquez Rocks.

Obstacles continued as the crew boarded their return flight to Los Angeles on June 29, to begin filming on sets July 3. One crew member was intoxicated, refused further alcohol by flight attendants and uttered a remark about a bomb which resulted in the plane being evacuated, cargo being searched, and all passengers being held in a holding area. The crew member was arrested for violating federal bomb threat laws while the remaining team had to wait another day for a flight, having to travel on a scheduled rest day and losing a day of filming in Los Angeles. The Buenos Aires education center classroom and biology lab sets were built on Sony Studios Stage 23 and filmed in late July. Jenkin's basement scenes were filmed on Stage 29; it involved a real ferret and features many of Heinlein's books in the background. The Jump Ball scene was filmed at the Long Beach Pyramid arena. Van Dien, Meyer, and Muldoon performed many of their own stunts for the scene apart from flips and somersaults, but otherwise encouraged each other to "go for it, try to lay me out." The exam results scene and the prom were both filmed at Kaiser Permanente. The prom scene involved over four hundred extras. The Federal Recruitment Center scene and the segment where Rico sees off Carmen were filmed over four days at the Los Angeles Convention Center, which Verhoeven chose because he considered its architecture to be futuristic and clean. The scenes there involved the highest number of extras in Starship Troopers, with about 400. Some minor scenes were also filmed at the Park Plaza Hotel.

It was difficult to find a location for the Camp Currie boot camp scenes until finding Mile Square Regional Park in Fountain Valley. Cameron liked it because it had an abandoned World War II blimp runway onto which they laid a top coat of tarmac and paint for a parade ground. It also fit their image of a low-pollution Earth, being surrounded by flat ground and many trees. About six weeks were spent transforming the site, including adding seventeen pre-fabricated buildings. For the Rico flagellation scene, Teo was trained to use a bullwhip by Armstrong, who himself learned while doubling for Harrison Ford in the Indiana Jones film series. The tip of the whip was removed to avoid harm and the camera angle concealed that the whip ended a short distance away from Van Dien.

The co-ed nude shower scene was filmed on a set at Sony Pictures and involved about fifteen cast members. Verhoeven had them gather around him clothed before clearing the set of all crew but himself and Vacano, after which he told the cast to undress at their own pace. Although some of the cast admitted to being nervous, they all undressed fairly quickly, but requested that Verhoeven and Vacano also be nude, to which they agreed. The scene would become one of Starship Troopers most infamous scenes, but Verhoeven remarked he had done a similar scene in RoboCop although few seemed to notice. For Starship Troopers he wanted people to take notice. He described the point of the scene as being that since all of the characters are fascists, they have no libido and only talk about their careers and combat. A separate nude scene was written for Richards but she refused to take part as she did not see the purpose.

Armstrong filmed many of the film's action sequences as well as the complex stunts and special effect sequences that would be too consuming for the first unit. Also working as the stunt director, Armstrong delegated much of the first unit stunt work to Dickey Beer to avoid overworking himself. The fight between Rico and Zander was mainly performed by their actors while wearing padding suits. Van Dien was injured during a stunt that involved him riding on the back of a gigantic, moving, fiberglass "Tanker Bug" shell. The movement kept slamming him into the shell as he was held in place with ropes, chipping one of his teeth and bruising his ribs over the  days of filming, but he refused to mention the pain and interrupt filming. One of the more dangerous stunts came near the end of filming, involving Van Dien, Busey, and Richards running out of an Arachnid tunnel followed by a real explosion. Only one take was done, and they were told that if someone tripped to pick them up and keep moving.

Despite the difficult conditions and obstacles, principal photography concluded after six months of filming generally six days a week on October 16, 1996, not longer after the intended finishing date. Second unit filming concluded a week later on October 23, after filming various explosions and background scenery. Armstrong estimated that about 40% of Starship Troopers constituted second unit-filmed scenes. Most effects scenes were shot early in the schedule so there was sufficient time for the effects team to complete their work.

Post-production
Post-production began in late October 1996, and concluded about August 1997, covering editing, music, and effects. Starship Troopers was edited by Mark Goldblatt with co-editor Caroline Ross. Goldblatt described Verhoeven as very collaborative, allowing them to interpret his footage in their own way and even allowing them input during filming on how special effects may be staged. Even so, he said Verhoeven was conservative with what he filmed and generally only captured what he wanted with no coverage footage. Some scenes were changed for the release, including trimming the scene of the Brain Bug sucking brains. Another scene, of Carmen kissing Rico at the end was cut because test audiences thought it was "immoral" after Zander's death, and were unconvinced that a woman could love both men simultaneously. The audiences were also unhappy with Carmen choosing her career over her relationship with Rico and wanted her to die at the end instead of Dizzy.

Several scenes were filmed during this period, including some of the FedNet propaganda sequences as there was no time to complete these during principal photography. Filmed over a week in late January 1997, with many of the same crew including Verhoeven and Vacano, mainly on location in and around Los Angeles, these sequences included survivors digging through the remains of Buenos Aires, shot on a vacant lot in downtown Los Angeles that was dressed with broken concrete and flame effects. Some of the crew stood in for the cast including Davison, Neumeier, Stacy Lumbrezer, and Paul Sammon, author of the film's "Making Of" book. Another scene of a psychic with a third eye was filmed in a Delta Airlines hangar at the Los Angeles International Airport. Starship Troopers is reported to have had a final budget of $100–$110million.

Two rough cut screenings were held on May 29 and 30, 1997, for executives, and the reaction was positive with discussions of a sequel. Discussing the long development of Starship Troopers, Marshall said that he was proud of it whether it was a success or not, but would be happiest if audiences appreciated the work that had gone into it. Davison called it the project he was proudest to have associated with his name.

Special effects

About half of the budget for Starship Troopers was dedicated to realizing the required 500 special effect shots. Tippett Studio was mainly responsible for producing effects relating to the Arachnids while Sony Pictures Imageworks (SPI) was tasked with spaceship effects. Davison wanted to use other studios but it was made clear to him by studio executives that the film would not receive financing  without using the in-house studio. SPI would lead to production problems, with their contributions falling months behind schedule and those effects that were completed being deemed insufficient by the filmmakers. A "highly placed" production employee said that SPI was poorly managed, disorganized, and rarely on set or involved in the production. while another said that SPI's priorities were split with developing the effects for the science fiction film, Contact (1997). Due to the high quantity of effects that needed to be completed, many of the special effects shots were reassigned from SPI to other companies, including Industrial Light & Magic (ILM), Boss Film Studios, Visual Concepts Engineering (VCE), and Mass. Illusion. Toward the end of production, visual effects supervisor Laura Buff recommended visual effects artist, Scott E. Anderson, to Verhoeven, who insisted Anderson take over as effects supervisor at SPI, which improved the studios output.

Designing the Arachnids was a collaborative process between Tippett, Hayes, Davison, Neumeier, and Verhoeven. Hayes said they "started by breaking the insects down into a bug hierarchy, then into individual groups. We did different drawings of bugs with weird stuff here and there, then fleshed out designs for each particular style. But there was a concerted effort to make them pretty familiar. [Starship Troopers] is not about this fantastic lifeform: the bugs had to be real and grounded so you wouldn't have any trouble telling the good guys from the bad guys." The final designs included the Warrior, Tanker, Plasma, Hopper, and Brain bugs. While CGI was the main method of realizing the creatures, some practical appliances were built by Amalgamated Dynamics, including two full-scale mechanized Warrior bugs capable of lifting an adult in their jaws.

Realizing the wide variety of effects for the spaceship scenes required the efforts of SPI, ILM, and Boss Film. Jim Martin and SPI art director Michael Scheffe were mainly responsible for the design of the craft, with Martin providing broad outlines which were given greater detail and a more consistent appearance by Scheffe. Alongside developing the appearance of most of the spacecraft, SPI was also primarily involved in designing the outer space battles. Verhoeven provided ongoing input on the designs, based on what he thought futuristic spaceships would look like, being less streamlined due to the lack of air resistance in space, and taking some influence from compact combat places, such as the de Havilland Mosquito used in World War II. 
Thunderstone, SPI's model department, had to construct the various necessary craft, such as dropships and attack fighters, as well as versions that could be destroyed and a full-scale attack fighter for some close-up scenes.

Music

The score for Starship Troopers was composed by Basil Poledouris over a six month period. Poledouris intended to score the film as an action movie, but Verhoeven wanted the music to offer a realistic background for the character's experiences. As a result, Poledouris focused on creating a sense of excitement, passion, and poignancy. He developed several distinct themes for specific characters and relationships, including one for the relationship between Rico and Carmen, and one for Rico and Dizzy, whom he considered the "heart" of Starship Troopers. He did not create a theme for the Arachnids, as he wanted their distinct noises to contrast with the music for the humans. Verhoeven eventually settled on Poledouris' theme for the Rodger Young spaceship as the basis for the overall score, with variations on this theme appearing throughout the score in cues later titled "Klendathu Drop." The score was recorded on a Sony Studios recording stage between June and September 1997, with a full orchestra of 97 musicians using mainly acoustic and percussion instruments. Evelyn Oz, a band including Poledouris' daughter, Zoe, performs two songs during the prom scene: an original song, "Into It," and "I Have Not Been to Oxford Town," composed by David Bowie.

Release

Context

In 1997, a record number of costly blockbuster films were released. By August, a record 10 films had earned over $100million, with The Lost World: Jurassic Park and Men in Black earning over $200million. However, the high cost of film production, with an average film costing $80million to produce and an additional $40million to promote, coupled with the large number of films vying for a limited audience, resulted in even successful films underperforming by 15%-20% at the box office.  Despite this, Sony Pictures set an industry record by earning over $500million in ticket sales from summer releases including Air Force One, Men in Black, and My Best Friend's Wedding. The company was also restructuring its business to focus on translating its films, including Starship Troopers, into media franchises that would extend their merchandising profitability beyond their time in theaters.

Marketing
The first trailer for Starship Troopers was released in November 1996, in front of Star Trek: First Contact, with the second playing before Men in Black and Air Force One in 1997. Starship Troopers was initially scheduled for release on July 2, 1997, but was later pushed back to July 25, then September, and finally November 7. These shifts were reportedly made to allow more time to complete special effects work and increase public awareness of the film, but it was also thought that Men in Black and Air Force One, which starred well-known actors like Harrison Ford, were more commercially viable options for Sony Pictures. Marshall, a producer on the film, stated that no one involved in the production was happy about moving an anticipated summer blockbuster to the autumn. Verhoeven later said that Davison, the film's producer, had told him it would "never make its money back. [Davison] saw there was a problem with the American audience better than I had."

Box office
The premiere of Starship Troopers took place on November 4, 1997 in Westwood, Los Angeles, with an afterparty at the Museum of Flying. In the United States and Canada, the film was released on November 7, 1997, earning approximately $22.1million from 2,971 theaters, an average of $7,424 per theater. It was the top film of the weekend, beating out Bean ($12.7million) and the horror I Know What You Did Last Summer ($6.5million), both in their fourth weekend. This also made it TriStar's third-largest opening weekend, behind Total Recall (1990) and Terminator 2: Judgment Day (1991). The New York Times gave 1,000 tickets for Bean to young males as a test, and recorded that many then snuck into the R-rated Starship Troopers.

In its second weekend, the film dropped to second place, earning $10million, ahead of the re-release of The Little Mermaid ($9.8million) and behind the debut of The Jackal ($15.2million). This represented a 54% decrease from the previous weekend's box office. In its third weekend, Starship Troopers fell to seventh place with a box office gross of $4.7million, and left the top 10 highest-grossing films by its sixth weekend in mid-December. The film left most theaters by the end of the year with a total box office gross of about $54.8million, making it the 33rdhighest-grossing film of the year. Outside of the U.S. and Canada, the film is estimated to have earned an additional $66.3million, giving it a worldwide box office of $121million against its $105million budget, and making it the 34thhighest-grossing film worldwide.

Reception

Critical response
Upon its release, Starship Troopers received generally negative reviews and was unpopular with critics and audiences. Audience polls by CinemaScore found that moviegoers gave the film an average grade of "C+" on an  scale.

Many reviewers did not interpret Starship Troopers as a satire and believed that its fascist themes were literal. An editorial in The Washington Post described the film as pro-fascist, made, directed, and written by Nazis. Stephen Hunter said the film was "spiritually" and "psychologically" Nazi and born of a Nazi-like imagination. Hunter described it as a "perversion" of Erich Maria Remarque's 1929 novel, All Quiet on the Western Front, which portrays the physical and mental tolls of war, by glorifying the horrors of war. Others, such as Empire, argued that the "constant fetishizing of weaponry" and "[Aryan] cast", combined with the militaristic imagery in RoboCop and Total Recall, made it seem as though Verhoeven admired Heinlein's world more than he claimed. Those who recognized the satirical elements said that the film walked a thin line between "overblown melodrama" and parody, with Verhoeven's RoboCop-style "news breaks", but that these ideas were often indistinguishable from the promotion of the "fascist utopia" it was satirizing. Salon argued that even with good satire, it is "self-defeatingly stupid" to use it in a story that wants its audience to care about its characters, and that Starship Troopers fails to replace Heinlein's themes with a worthwhile ideal. The Los Angeles Times wrote that Verhoeven had "lost his touch" with satire by failing to respect his audiences' intelligence and make the world of Starship Troopers interesting or convincing.

Reviews generally regarded Starship Troopers as an unintelligent and "discordant" combination of ultraviolence, poor acting, and special effects, but in spite of this, it was one of the more "jaw-dropping" films of the year, amid a series of "disappointing" blockbusters. Berardinelli said that at its best, Starship Troopers replicated the thrills of Aliens (1986), while emulating Beverly Hills, 90210 in its worst moments. Roger Ebert said that Heinlein's novel was written for juveniles and the film's content would only be of interest to younger audiences. Janet Maslin and Kenneth Turan found Neuemeier's script to be unsuccessful in transitioning from the teenage love story to the carnage of war, but that Starship Troopers remained watchable as a live-action comic book. Turan, in particular, said that unlike its contemporaries, such as Independence Day and Twister (both 1996), Starship Troopers benefitted from a lack of pretence, that the effects were less important than emotions or "pseudo-sensitivity." Ebert concluded that, apart from the satire, Starship Troopers lacked any humanity or basic entertainment value with which to establish a connection to the audience.

Reviews were generally dismissive of the central cast, describing them as "no name" "mannequins" that offered an all-American superficial Aryan stereotype of beauty, while criticizing their limited acting abilities that made some of their critically derided peers seem like "classical thespians", and made it difficult to become invested in the narrative. Even so, some critics, such as James Berardinelli, said that Starship Troopers content would not work with good "or even competent" actors. Berardinelli also praised the cast for being "appealing and enthusiastic," particularly Van Dien and Meyer for retaining some human interest once the special effect sequences become more prominent.

Jonathan Rosenbaum and others found the violence to be consistent with Verhoeven's other work, offering a "kinky-camp ghoulishness", but that the battles with waves of Arachnids were "joyless", emotionally unsatisfying, and grew tiresome because the creatures lacked any personality and that audiences would quickly become desensitized to the extreme gore. Ebert said the battles were worsened by the "boring" rock-like planets on which the battles took place, that featured no other species beyond humans and Arachnids. The film's special effects received a mixed reception from those who found them impressive or "astonishing", and others who thought that the creations sometimes faltered and looked fake.

Accolades
At the 2nd Golden Satellite Awards in 1998, Starship Troopers was nominated for Best Motion Picture (Animated or Mixed Media). For the 70th Academy Awards, Tippett, Scott E. Anderson, Alec Gillis, and John Richardson were nominated for Best Visual Effects. Starship Troopers was also nominated for Best Action Sequence at the MTV Movie Awards, as well as receiving a nomination for Best Dramatic Presentation from the Hugo Awards.

The Stinkers Bad Movie Awards ceremony saw Starship Troopers nominated for Worst Picture, losing to Batman & Robin.

Post-release

Performance analysis
Retrospective analysis has attempted to understand the reasons for Starship Troopers''' poor performance at the box office.  The film generally failed to connect with either critics or audiences, who found its mixture of satire, violence, gore, and "cheesy" performances unappealing to mainstream audiences. Other industry experts believe it was also adversely affected by the number of successful science fiction and genre films released in that year, such as The Lost World: Jurassic Park ($618.6million), Men in Black ($587.8million), and The Fifth Element ($263.9million). Additionally, Starship Troopers was released just a few weeks before Titanic ($1.8billion), which became the highest-grossing film of its time, as well as other successful or anticipated films such as Alien Resurrection, Flubber, Scream 2, and the latest James Bond film Tomorrow Never Dies.The Washington Post also accused Starship Troopers of being a pro-Nazi film made by two Nazis, Verhoeven and Neumeier. Verhoeven said "We were accused by The Washington Post of being neo-Nazis!... It was tremendously disappointing. They couldn't see that all I have done is ironically create a fascist utopia." The narrative that Starship Troopers was effectively a "neo-Nazi" film was picked up by European news publications, such as Germany, Italy, and France. Verhoeven described it as "extremely punishing to us," and had to repeatedly explain to European journalists the context that Starship Troopers was using fascist imagery ironically. Verhoeven believed this helped dissuade audiences from turning out to see Starship Troopers and, alongside poor word-of-mouth from audiences that did attend, the U.S. box office gross dropped a rare 50% in its second weekend. The title was also seen as a possible factor, leading audiences to expect something akin to a light-hearted adventure such as Star Wars instead of a film about fascism. Verhoeven also believed audiences were not happy about Dizzy dying instead of Carmen, remarking "we were trying to be good feminists." American historian Robert Sklar suggested that audiences had also grown tired of alien war films and science-fiction adventure in general after the recent releases of Mars Attacks! (1996), the blockbuster Independence Day (1996), and the Star Wars special editions  (1997), and anticipated a resurgence in war films based on World War II instead. Verhoeven believed Starship Troopers had been poorly marketed in the U.S. by labelling it as an action film, in turn leading critics and audiences to overlook the satire. A Los Angeles Times editorial speculated the decision could have been a deliberate choice by the studio because satire films did not perform as well. Verhoeven anecdotally remarked that it was appropriately marketed as a satire in the United Kingdom.

Home mediaStarship Troopers was released on VHS in 1998 and on DVD in 1999. The DVD included additional features such as a documentary about the making of the film, screen tests with some of the actors, commentary by Verhoeven and Neumeier, and deleted scenes including an alternate ending in which Rico and Carmen officially get back together. In 2002, a 2-disc Special Edition DVD was released with additional features, including commentary by Verhoeven, Neumeier, and the cast, breakdowns of the special effects, and several documentaries: "Death from Above," a retrospective about the making of the film, "Know Your Foe," about creating the various Arachnid creatures, "The Starships of Starship Troopers," "FX Comparisons," showing how various components were combined to create various scenes, and "Scene De-Constructions," a breakdown of some scenes with commentary by Verhoeven.Starship Troopers was released on Blu-ray in 2008, containing many previously released extras and the addition of FedNet mode, which places a graphic overlay to the film with pop-up facts. A 4K Ultra HD Blu-ray remastered version was released for the film's 20th anniversary with previously released extras. A 25th anniversary 4K Blu-ray was released in 2022, in a limited edition steelbook case, and includes a reunion discussion between Neumeier, Van Dien, Richards, Meyer, Ironside, Brown, Busey, and Gilliam. The film score was released on compact disc (CD) in 1997, by Varèse Sarabande, but was criticized for including only 30 minutes of content. Bootleg copies were made containing additional material using the score from the film's DVD release. A limited edition 2-disc CD was released in 2016, containing additional tracks.

 Other mediaStarship Troopers merchandise included miniatures, action figures, and "Insect Touch," a three issue comic book by Dark Horse Comics. Toy manufacturer Galoob developed twelve different products including action figures and vehicles. Retailers were reluctant to stock toys for an R-rated film, with both Wal-Mart and Target, which represented about 20% of all action figure sales, declining, although Toys "R" Us and KB Toys agreed. Sony executives called it an "open secret" that children were attending R-rated films. Author Paul Sammon spent six months accompanying filming for Starship Troopers, through pre-production and leading up to the film's release. His resulting work was released alongside the film as The Making of Starship Troopers. A CGI animated television series, Roughnecks: Starship Troopers Chronicles, was released in 1999. Based on elements of the film and Heinlein's novel, the series ran for forty episodes.

The 1976 board game Starship Troopers was re-released and repackaged alongside the film as Starship Troopers: Prepare for Battle. A Starship Troopers pinball game was also released in 1997. Starship Troopers: Terran Ascendancy, a strategy game, was released in 2000. A 2005 video game Starship Troopers features a narrative set five years after the events of the film, with Van Dien returning to voice Rico. A 2022 strategy game  Starship Troopers – Terran Command allows the player to defend colonies against the Arachnid forces.

 Themes and analysis 
Politics and propagandaStarship Troopers explores themes including patriotism, authoritarianism, militarism, colonialism, and xenophobia. Verhoeven interpreted Heinlein's novel as fascistic, nationalistic, totalitarian, and in favor of military rule, something antithetical to the director's beliefs following his childhood experiences under the Nazi occupation of the Netherlands during World War II, and used the film adaptation to deconstruct and undermine these themes.  Iconography of the German Nazi regime and Italian National Fascist Party, led by Adolf Hitler and Benito Mussolini respectively, appear throughout Starship Troopers as symbols of fascism belonging to the United Citizen Federation (UCF). The UCF flag, bearing an eagle, resembles that of the Nazi coat of arms, officer uniforms resemble those worn by the Nazi secret police, the Gestapo, including the insignia, and the infantry uniforms bear a symbol similar to Mussolini's Blackshirts. Neumeier said the Nazi uniforms were used, in part, because "the Germans made the best-looking stuff," but Verhoeven also wanted to use that aesthetic in "an artistic way." Although some contemporary critics and audiences considered Starship Troopers to be an endorsement of fascism, Verhoeven said, "whenever you see something that you think is fascist, you should know that the filmmakers agree with your opinion."

Other aspects of the Nazi regime influence Starship Troopers, from the architecture of Albert Speer, to propaganda films such as Triumph of the Will and Olympia by Leni Riefenstahl. The first scene of Starship Troopers, an advertisement for the Mobile Infantry, emulates scenes from Triumph of the Will, including the dialogue, "I'm doing my part!" Although some critics believed Starship Troopers was supportive of fascism, Verhoeven emulated these themes to deliberately portray the film's protagonists as fascists, while casting attractive actors, described by Entertainment Weekly as conveying the Aryan ideal of beauty, to "seduce the audience into joining  [Starship Troopers] society... but then ask, 'What are you really joining up for?'" In the novel, Rico is revealed at the end to be Fillipino, a deliberate choice to make readers empathise with the character before revealing he is not Caucasian. Verhoeven chose to make Rico white to further satirize the fascistic messaging. Further influence was taken from writer, Susan Sontag's 1975 essay, "Fascinating Fascisms," that identifies key aspects of Nazism, such as the "cult of beauty," "fetishism of courage," "repudiation of the intellect," and serving the community at the expense of the self.Entertainment Weekly and The A.V. Club believed the filmmakers considered the main characters to be "petty and stupid," but that the film's best joke lies in Rico not being very intelligent but, in turn, becoming the ideal Citizen and the "perfect blunt instrument" for the Arachnid war, abandoning any personal hopes and dreams outside of Military life, to seek revenge against the creatures that apparently killed his parents. The propaganda depicted in Starship Troopers on the "FedNet" uses extreme examples to satirize the UCF, such as children holding weapons or stamping on cockroaches while an adult looks on happily, as well as slogans such as "Join the Mobile Infantry and save the world" and "Service guarantees citizenship." Writer Darren Mooney considered the FedNet to be prescient of the increasing prominence of fake news, presenting stories that those in positions of power want the populace to see, emphasizing patriotism and duty, while offering an illusion of choice and enlightenment by asking "would you like to know more?" The youth are indoctrinated through these slogans and propaganda, and information relating to the Arachnids is intended to provoke a xenophobic response, both convincing the protagonists that their cause is righteous and presenting the Arachnids as less than, by saying "the only good bug is a dead bug." Peace is never presented as an option. The A.V. Club wrote that Starship Troopers presents a society that has been convinced to trade its freedoms, rights, and identities for security from an alien threat.Starship Troopers was also Verhoeven's response to events he perceived in contemporary U.S. politics, such as limited gun restrictions and an increase of capital punishment, which he believed could eventually result in open fascism, as well as films that glorified U.S. military forces and depicted a casual attitude to violence. Entertainment Weekly found similarities between Starship Troopers and the action film Top Gun (1986), which follows physically strong, young, and attractive United States Navy pilots combating a vague enemy. Several action films from the 1990s, such as Independence Day (1996) and Air Force One (1997), also offered a similar American jingoism and pro-military message, with both films featuring a U.S. president character who is able to take an active role in the action because of their military backgrounds.

Citizenship and violence
In the militaristic society depicted in Starship Troopers, many rights are reserved only for citizens, those who have served in the military, and restricted to ordinary civilians. The boot camp shower scene involves several characters discussing their reason for enlistment, such as being able to serve as a politician, have children, receive a scholarship, or just not having to work on a farm. Such options, typical of everyone within a democracy, are restricted by the military government governing Earth, because they must be earned through military service. Even voting is presented as an act of force, of supreme authority, a right that must be taken instead of given. As Rasczak tells his students, "violence has resolved more conflicts than anything else. The contrary opinion that violence doesn't solve anything is merely wishful thinking at worst." The nudity in the shower scene was criticized, but Verhoeven believed such criticism was hypocritical, believing it was easier to depict extreme violence in American films without censorship than nudity. He wanted to convey that despite their nudity, the characters do not comment or react to the fact, implying that their libido was suppressed by their dedication to fascism, the war, and their careers.

Although humanity is mainly presented as victims of the Arachnid threat, aspects of Starship Troopers reveal that humanity may have instigated the conflict by invading Arachnid worlds, and the creatures are defending themselves.  The Arachnid's asteroid that strikes Earth is used to justify a full-scale war. This presents a cycle of war, in which Earth's youths are emboldened by the propaganda slogans to become readily disposable infantry.

These soldiers' orders are to kill anything inhuman, and strategic failures are solved by using more soldiers. Writer Lloyd Farley considered the gory and explicit scenes depicting the dead as being intended to overtly display the "horrors of war" in a society solely dedicated to conflict. The countless soldier deaths on Planet P are quickly forgotten as troops celebrate their victory and capture of the Brain Bug, with the potential promise this will lead to the end of the war, but no actual conclusion is offered in Starship Troopers. This violence is reinforced with rewards, such as Rico's repeated promotions, but these openings often arise because his predecessor was killed. Starship Troopers culminates with the surviving protagonists not disagreeing with this system or choosing to fight against it, but becoming a part of it by appearing in recruitment propaganda to enlist the next generation of troops.

Legacy
 Critical reassessment 
Despite its initial negative reception, Starship Troopers has been re-evaluated and is now considered one of the best science fiction films ever made. The film has grown in esteem in the decades since its release, with retrospective analyses describing it as among the most subversive and misunderstood Hollywood studio films ever made, undermined by critics and audiences who misinterpreted the anti-fascist satire as an "endorsement of a fascist utopia." The Verge and The Atlantic described it as an obvious satire, in hindsight, that was released at the wrong time, amid an era of prosperity in the United States during the late 1990s when American audiences may not have seen, or wanted to see, the criticisms of their own society. The marketing was also blamed, which presented Starship Troopers as a typical science fiction action film, making it easy for audiences not expecting satire to misinterpret it. Other publications argued that Starship Troopers was an example of Poe's law, where views are presented to such an extreme that it becomes impossible for audiences to understand if it is parody or serious.

Opinions on the film gradually changed alongside societal shifts, making the satire more obvious, particularly in the 2010s as its critiques of right-wing militarism, the military–industrial complex, reactionary violence and American jingoism, made it seem ahead of its time. In a 2020 retrospective, for The New Yorker, David Roth argued that Starship Troopers message had become more meaningful because it presents a narrative in which humanity, built on a culture of fascism and violence, "gets its ass kicked," and its only solution is to inflict more violence, to little success. Roth further contrasted the culture of violence to contemporary police brutality against peaceful protests or government attempts to defeat the COVID-19 pandemic through will. Syfy said it remained "riveting," but was undermined by poor acting (even if that was intended) and melodrama.

Alongside being looked on more favorably by critics, Starship Troopers is also considered a cult classic and an "unsung masterpiece." Empire called it the true spiritual successor to RoboCops "savage satire" and "gonzo violence," unlike that film's own sequels. Starship Troopers is now considered one of the best films of the 1990s. In 2021, the British Film Institute named it one of the 10 greatest science fiction adaptations. The website's critical consensus reads, "A fun movie...if you can accept the excessive gore and wooden acting." The film has a score of 51 out of 100 on Metacritic based on 20 critics' reviews, indicating "mixed or average reviews."

Cultural influenceStarship Troopers has continued to generate interest in the decades since its release, in part because of its critical reassessment, but also because of its elements which came to reflect future events such as September 11, 2001 terrorist attacks and the subsequent actions of the U.S. government and president George W. Bush to convince the American people to surrender certain liberties to enable a war and defeat their enemies. Retrospectives in the late 2010s and early 2020s have described how a contemporary rise in fascist activity in the U.S. had made Starship Troopers seem prescient and more of a warning than satire. The A.V. Club described Starship Troopers as a "brilliant dissection" of wars and how propaganda is used to justify young people being sent to their deaths against a dehumanized enemy.

Verhoeven followed Starship Troopers with the 2000 science fiction horror Hollow Man, a film that he believed lacked his own personal style as he acquiesced to studio demands. Disillusioned with the Hollywood studio system, and compounded by the failures of Showgirls and Starship Troopers, Verhoeven returned to Europe to work outside of the Hollywood studio system, going on to earn acclaim for his subsequent works such as Black Book (2006) and Elle (2016). In 2015, Van Dien remarked: "There has not been a week in my life since I did [Starship Troopers] where I can go down the street without someone going 'Rico!'" Richards has said she loved her character and how people responded to her as a strong female.

Several filmmakers have named it as an influence or among their favorite films, including Ari Aster, Margaret Brown, Macaulay Culkin, David Lowery, Robert Rodriguez, Eli Roth, Riley Stearns, Quentin Tarantino, James Wan and Edgar Wright. A 2020 retrospective by The Guardian suggested that, with hindsight, Starship Troopers formed the final instalment of Verhoeven's unofficial science fiction action film trilogy about authoritarian governance, preceded by RoboCop (1987) and Total Recall (1990). Slogans used in the film, such as "I'm doing my part!" and "Would you like to know more?", have since become part of the cultural lexicon.

In 2022, Starship Troopers inspired the ending credits sequence for the popular anime Kaguya-sama: Love Is War.

 Sequels and remake 

Verhoeven had never developed a sequel to any of his films, but he was interested in directing a sequel to Starship Troopers, depending on its performance, although he said "I would need another three or four years of thinking to make sure the movie doesn't repeat itself." The relative failure of Starship Troopers derailed plans for a theatrical sequel and Verhoeven moved on to other projects. Even so, Starship Troopers was followed by two low-budget, direct-to-home media sequels. The first, Starship Troopers 2: Hero of the Federation (2004), was directed by Tippett from a script by Neumeier and featured no returning cast or characters. Neumeier wrote and directed the second sequel, Starship Troopers 3: Marauder (2008), which brought back Van Dien as an older Rico. The series narrative was continued in two CGI animated films: Starship Troopers: Invasion (2012) sees the return of Rico, Jenkins, and Ibanez (with different voice actors), while Starship Troopers: Traitor of Mars (2017) was written by Neumeier and features voice acting by Van Dien and Meyer.

Beginning in 2011, reports suggested that producer Neal Moritz and Columbia Pictures were interested in rebooting the Starship Troopers'' film series by more closely following Heinlein's novel; there have been no updates since 2016. Verhoeven was unhappy with the idea of the reboot being more faithful to the book. In 2021, Van Dien said a potential television series was being discussed at Sony Pictures Television, although talks had been stalled due to the ongoing COVID-19 pandemic.

References

Notes

Citations

Works cited

External links 
 
 
 
 
 

1997 films
1990s science fiction action films
American science fiction adventure films
1990s satirical films
1990s science fiction adventure films
American coming-of-age films
American satirical films
American science fiction action films
American science fiction war films
American splatter films
American teen films
1990s English-language films
Films about extraterrestrial life
Films based on American novels
Films based on science fiction novels
Films directed by Paul Verhoeven
Films scored by Basil Poledouris
Films set in Buenos Aires
Films set in the 23rd century
Films set on fictional planets
Films shot in South Dakota
Films shot in Wyoming
Films about impact events
War adventure films
Starship Troopers films
Touchstone Pictures films
TriStar Pictures films
1990s American films
Anti-war films